Johann Langmayr (29 August 1910 – 1943) was an Austrian hurdler. He competed in the men's 110 metres hurdles at the 1936 Summer Olympics. He was killed in action during World War II.

References

1910 births
1943 deaths
Athletes (track and field) at the 1936 Summer Olympics
Austrian male hurdlers
Olympic athletes of Austria
Place of birth missing
Austrian military personnel killed in World War II